Shota Iamanidze (born 15 March 1937 in Tbilisi; died 15 October 1971 in Tbilisi) was a Georgian and Soviet football player.

Iamanidze died in a car accident at the age of 34.

International career
Iamanidze made his debut for USSR on 13 September 1959 in the game against Bulgaria.

Honours

Player

Club
 Dinamo Tbilisi
 Soviet Top League: 1964
 Soviet Top League bronze medalist: 1959, 1962, 1967

References

External links
  Photo Archive at National Parliamentary Library of Georgia 
  Profile at Biographical Dictionary of Georgian Athletes
  Profile at Sportstat.gov.ge
  Profile at Rusteam.Permian.ru
  Profile and Statistics at FootballFacts.ru

1937 births
1971 deaths
Footballers from Tbilisi
Soviet footballers
Footballers from Georgia (country)
FC Dinamo Tbilisi players
Soviet Top League players
Olympic footballers of the Soviet Union
Road incident deaths in the Soviet Union
Association football midfielders